Emile Faurie (born 15 October 1963) is a British equestrian. He competed at the 1992 Summer Olympics and the 2000 Summer Olympics.

References

1963 births
Living people
British male equestrians
Olympic equestrians of Great Britain
Equestrians at the 1992 Summer Olympics
Equestrians at the 2000 Summer Olympics
Sportspeople from Johannesburg